The Quartet That Split Up (Swedish: Kvartetten som sprängdes) is a 1950 Swedish comedy film directed by Gustaf Molander and starring Adolf Jahr, Anita Björk, Inga Landgré and Victor Sjöström. It is an adaptation of the 1924 novel of the same title by Birger Sjöberg, which had previously been made into a 1936 film. It was shot at the Råsunda Studios in Stockholm. The film's sets were designed by the art director Nils Svenwall.

Synopsis
The members of a string quartet in a small Swedish town decided to speculate on the stock market with unexpected results.

Cast
 Adolf Jahr as Karl Ludvig Sundelin
 Anita Björk as 	Maj Andersson
 Inga Landgré as 	Märta Åvik
 Victor Sjöström as 	Gustaf Borg
 Edvin Adolphson as Anders Åvik
 Sven Lindberg as	Editor Bengt 'Cello' Erlandsson
 Jarl Kulle as 	Ture Borg
 Dagmar Ebbesen as 	Aunt Klara
 Marianne Löfgren as 	Selma Åvik
 Gunnar Björnstrand as 	Engineer Planertz
 Olof Winnerstrand as 	Olsén
 Torsten Winge as Löf
 Gösta Gustafson as 	Organist
 Stig Olin as 	Werner	
 Anders Andelius as 	Borg's shop assistant
 Margit Andelius as 	Olsén's guest 
 Gunwer Bergkvist as 	Member of Anemon choire 
 John W. Björling as 	Man at the waterfront 
 Gunnar Bohman as 	Olsén's guest 
 Karl Bornfors as 	Viola player 
 Ernst Brunman as Olsén's guest 
 Elsa Ebbesen as 	Mrs. Tillberg 
 Hans Edelskog as 	Edmund Åvik 
 Rune Halvarsson as 	Jensen, barber 
 Olle Hilding as 	Thun 
 Birger Lensander as Factory manager 
 Torsten Lilliecrona as 	Rescuer 
 John Melin as 	Stolz 
 Björn Näslund as 	Olle, Edmund's friend 
 Elvin Ottoson as 	Olsén's guest 
 Aurore Palmgren as 	Alida, Borg's housemaid 
 Olav Riégo as 	Editor at Kuriren 
 Lasse Sarri as 	Pelle, Edmund's friend
 Hanny Schedin as Alma, Åvik's housemaid 
 Georg Skarstedt as 	Backlund 
 Carl Ström as 	Mr. Bergström 
 Einar Söderbäck as 	Factory worker 
 Eric von Gegerfelt as 	Olsén's guest 
 Birger Åsander as Factory worker 
 Gunnar Öhlund as 	Rescuer 
 Alf Östlund as 	Olsén's guest

References

Bibliography 
 Goble, Alan. The Complete Index to Literary Sources in Film. Walter de Gruyter, 1999.
 Qvist, Per Olov & von Bagh, Peter. Guide to the Cinema of Sweden and Finland. Greenwood Publishing Group, 2000.

External links 
 

1950 films
Swedish comedy films
1950 comedy films
1950s Swedish-language films
Films directed by Gustaf Molander
Swedish black-and-white films
Films based on Swedish novels
Remakes of Swedish films
1950s Swedish films